Nes is a village in Luster Municipality in Vestland county, Norway. The village sits along Norwegian County Road 55, which follows the coastline of the fjord. Nes Church is located in the village.

References

Villages in Vestland
Luster, Norway